The Cuckoo Tree is a children's novel by Joan Aiken, first published in 1971.  Taking place in an alternate history, the story presents the further adventures of Dido Twite, a teenage Victorian tomboy, in southern England.
The novel is chronologically the fifth of the Wolves Chronicles, a series of books set in a fictional 19th century in which the Stuart kings had not been ousted by William of Orange; a key plot driver (from Black Hearts in Battersea) is the efforts of "Hanoverians" to overthrow "King James III" and his heirs.  The Cuckoo Tree was published before its prequel, The Stolen Lake. 
'The Cuckoo Tree' is also a sequel to 'The Whispering Mountain', with Captain Hughes of HMS 'Thrush', (the ship is also mentioned in the Felix series) eventually reunited with his son, Owen, the hero of the previous book, who takes part in the coronation, but is otherwise only briefly mentioned in 'The Cuckoo Tree'.

Plot 

Captain Hughes and Dido Twite are travelling by stagecoach from the port of Chichester with important dispatches for the Admiralty in London when the carriage is upset and Captain Hughes is injured.  While looking for help, Dido encounters a group of men who direct her to Teaglaze Manor; the men turn out to be smugglers who use the local canal system to transport their wares to London.

At Teagleaze Manor, Dido encounters several characters including Lady Tegleaze, who sends her servants and personal physician to the aid of Captain Hughes.  Hughes is settled in an abandoned tenant cottage to recover, under the care of a local nurse, the unpleasant Mrs. Lubbage.

Unwilling to trust the local postman and needing to get the dispatches to London, Dido goes to "the Cuckoo Tree," a local landmark used as a rendezvous by the smugglers.  There she encounters Cris, a mysterious child who proves to be a key element in a plot to swindle Lady Tegleaze out of her property.  However there is another plot afoot; Lady Tegleaze's lawyer, Mr. Fitzpickwick, is in league with a Hanoverian agent planning to kill the young king at his coronation.

With the aid of Cris and the Wineberry smugglers, Dido must rescue Lady Tegleaze' grandson Sir Tobit and race the Hanoverian plotters to St. Pauls Cathedral, where her old friend Simon is now Master of the King's Garlandries.

Characters 

 Dido Twite, a teenage cockney; the protagonist of the novel
 Captain Hughes, of H. M. S. Thrush, the ship which picked up Dido in Nantucket
 Lady Tegleaze, owner of Teagleaze Manor and its declining estates
 Gusset, butler to Lady Tegleaze
 Sir Tobit, the grandson of Lady Tegleaze
 Daisy Lubbage, a famous nurse and herbalist
 Cris, an orphan under the care of Mrs. Lubbage
 Yan Wineberry, a smuggler and the son of Mr. Gusset
 Desmond Twite, aka Pa, Dido's father and an activist of the Hanoverian cause
 King Richard IV, son and heir of James III

References 

Aitken, Joan. The Cuckoo Tree, Doubleday & Company, Inc.  1971
 Preview at Google Books

External links 

1971 British novels
1971 children's books
Children's historical novels
British children's novels
British alternative history novels
English novels
Novels set in England
Novels by Joan Aiken
Doubleday (publisher) books